Henry R. King (c. 1826 – 18 October 1903) was a British trade union leader. He was a leading advocate for women's trade unionism who served for many years as treasurer of the London Trades Council.

King worked as a bookbinder, and joined the London Consolidated Society of Journeymen Bookbinders, a long established union, led by Thomas Dunning.  Dunning suffered an accident in 1871, and as a result, King was in his place appointed as secretary to a joint committee campaigning for a maximum nine hour working day.  The committee brought together the London Consolidated Society together with the Dayworking Bookbinders Society and the Bookbinders' Consolidated Union, and quickly achieved its aim.

By 1873, Dunning's health had not improved, and he had to resign as secretary of the London Consolidated Society.  Following his success with the nine hour day campaign, King was elected as his successor.  He was also elected as treasurer of the London Trades Council, and in 1874 he was a founder member of the Women's Trade Union League.  His support of women's trade unionism was not shared by everyone in the movement, and led to a major dispute in 1883, when the London Consolidated Society ignored requests from the Dublin branch of the Consolidated Union for support in a strike opposing the employment of women bookbinders in the city.  A committee of the Trades Union Congress was assembled, and the London Consolidated Society was required to pay some costs of the Dublin branch.

Under King's leadership, the union's membership grew steadily, reaching 1,240 by 1896.  He retired in 1899, and was granted a pension of 30 shillings per week.  He died four years later.

References

1820s births
1903 deaths
General secretaries of British trade unions
Trade unionists from London